Michael Albert Hartenstine (born July 27, 1953) is an American former professional football player who was a defensive end in the National Football League (NFL). He played for the Chicago Bears from 1975 to 1986 and the Minnesota Vikings in 1987.

Early life and education
Hartenstine was born on July 27, 1953 in Bethlehem, Pennsylvania in the Lehigh Valley region of eastern Pennsylvania, where he played high school football at Liberty High School in Bethlehem. He played college football at Pennsylvania State University, where he was a collegiate All-American.

National Football League
Hartenstine entered the 1975 NFL Draft and was selected by the Chicago Bears in the second round with the 31st overall selection. In his 1975 rookie season with the Bears, he was named to the Pro Football Writers of America NFL All-Rookie Team.

Hartenstine was the oldest player on the Super Bowl XX-winning Bears team in 1985. In his career with the Bears, he played in 184 games and had 85 career tackles.

In 2019, Hartenstine was named to the Bears' "100 Greatest Bears of All-Time".

References

1953 births
Living people
American football defensive ends
Chicago Bears players
Minnesota Vikings players
Penn State Nittany Lions football players
All-American college football players
Liberty High School (Bethlehem, Pennsylvania) alumni
Sportspeople from Bethlehem, Pennsylvania
Players of American football from Pennsylvania